The Texas Panhandle is a region of the U.S. state of Texas consisting of the northernmost 26 counties in the state. The panhandle is a square-shaped area bordered by New Mexico to the west and Oklahoma to the north and east. It is adjacent to the Oklahoma Panhandle. The Handbook of Texas defines the southern border of Swisher County as the southern boundary of the Texas Panhandle region.

The Texas Panhandle is slightly larger in size than the US state of West Virginia. An additional  is covered by water. Its population as of the 2010 census was 427,927 residents, or 1.7% of the state's total population. However, more than 72% of the Panhandle's residents live in the Amarillo Metropolitan Area, which is the largest and fastest-growing urban area in the region. The Panhandle is distinct from North Texas, which is further south and east.

West of the Caprock Escarpment and North and South of the Canadian River breaks, the surface of the Llano Estacado is rather flat. South of the city of Amarillo, the level terrain gives way to Palo Duro Canyon, the second-largest canyon in the United States. This colorful canyon was carved by the Prairie Dog Town Fork Red River, a tributary of the Red River. North of Amarillo lies Lake Meredith, a reservoir created by Sanford Dam constructed on the main stem of the Canadian River. Lake Meredith and the Ogallala Aquifer are the primary sources of freshwater in this semi-arid region of the High Plains.

Interstate Highway 40 passes through the Panhandle, and also passes through Amarillo. The freeway passes through Deaf Smith, Oldham, Potter, Carson, Gray, Donley, and Wheeler Counties.

Demographics
As of the census of 2020, about 434,358 people lived in the Panhandle. Of these, 53.6% were non-Hispanic White, 35.2% were Hispanic, 4.8% were African American, 2.8% were Asian. Only 4.1% were of some other ethnicity. About 92.3% of inhabitants claimed native birth, and 8.9% were veterans of the United States armed forces; 49.9% of the population was male, and 50.1% was female. Around 13.2% of the population was 65 years of age or older, whereas 27.8% of the population was under 18 years of age.

Counties
Twenty-six counties of the Panhandle (west to east, from the northwest corner):

<li> Dallam
<li> Sherman
<li> Hansford
<li> Ochiltree
<li> Lipscomb
<li> Hartley
<li> Moore
<li> Hutchinson
<li> Roberts
<li> Hemphill
<li> Oldham 
<li> Potter
<li> Carson
<li> Gray
<li> Wheeler
<li> Deaf Smith
<li> Randall
<li> Armstrong
<li> Donley
<li> Collingsworth
<li> Parmer 
<li> Castro
<li> Swisher
<li> Briscoe
<li> Hall
<li> Childress

Cities and towns
Major cities of the Texas Panhandle with populations greater than 10,000 include: 

Amarillo
Borger
Canyon
Dumas
Hereford
Pampa

Some of the smaller towns with populations less than 10,000 include: 

Booker
Bovina
Cactus
Canadian
Channing
Childress
Clarendon
Claude
Dalhart
Darrouzett
Dimmitt
Dodson
Follett
Friona
Fritch
Groom
Gruver
Happy
Hartley
Higgins
Lefors
Masterson
McLean
Memphis
Mobeetie
Panhandle
Perryton
Sanford
Shamrock
Silverton
Spearman
Stinnett
Stratford
Sunray
Texline
Tulia
Turkey
Vega
Wellington
Wheeler
White Deer

Gallery

See also

 Antelope Creek phase
 Buffalo Lake National Wildlife Refuge
 Caprock Escarpment
 List of geographical regions in Texas
 List of airports in the Texas Panhandle
 Llano Estacado
 Oklahoma Panhandle
 Palo Duro Canyon
 Prairie Dog Town Fork Red River
 Texas State Highway 207
 West Texas

References

External links

 
Regions of Texas